Sebastián Emanuel Moyano (born 26 August 1990) is an Argentine professional footballer who plays as a goalkeeper for Unión Santa Fe.

Career
Moyano's youth was spent with Centro Deportivo Rivadavia and Godoy Cruz. He began featuring for Godoy Cruz in September 2011 when he was an unused substitute for league games against All Boys and Newell's Old Boys. After further unused sub appearances in 2012–13, Moyano made his senior debut on 17 June 2013 against Quilmes. Thirty more appearances followed for Moyano across the next three seasons. In July 2017, after not featuring for Godoy Cruz since 13 May 2015, Moyano left the club to join Aldosivi in Primera B Nacional. His first appearance came in a Copa Argentina loss to Vélez Sarsfield on 4 September.

After achieving promotion with Aldosivi in 2017–18, Moyano departed at the conclusion of the campaign to join subsequent league counterparts Gimnasia y Esgrima.

Career statistics
.

Honours
Aldosivi
Primera B Nacional: 2017–18

References

External links

1990 births
Living people
Sportspeople from Mendoza, Argentina
Argentine footballers
Association football goalkeepers
Argentine Primera División players
Primera Nacional players
Godoy Cruz Antonio Tomba footballers
Aldosivi footballers
Club de Gimnasia y Esgrima La Plata footballers
Unión de Santa Fe footballers